George Perry Graham,  (March 31, 1859 – January 1, 1943) was a journalist, editor and politician in Ontario, Canada.

In the 1898 Ontario provincial election, he was elected to the Legislative Assembly of Ontario, and re-elected in 1902 and 1905. In 1904, he was appointed to the cabinet as Provincial Secretary by Premier George William Ross and served in that position until the Ross government lost the election of 1905.

When Ross resigned as leader of the Ontario Liberal Party in 1907, Graham briefly succeeded him, but quickly left later that year for federal politics when he was appointed Minister of Railway and Canals in the Liberal government of Sir Wilfrid Laurier.

Ross won a seat in the House of Commons of Canada in a by-election in 1907. He was defeated in the 1911 federal election that brought Robert Borden's Conservatives to power, but returned to the House of Commons in a 1912 by-election. He did not run in the 1917 election, but then was elected in Essex South in 1921.

In 1921, he served in a number of defence portfolios (Minister of Militia and Defence and Minister of the Naval Service from 1921 to 1922 and then as Minister of Defence from January 1 to April 27, 1923) in the Cabinet of William Lyon Mackenzie King. He lost his seat in the 1925 federal election, but was appointed to the Senate of Canada in 1926, and sat in that body until his death in 1943.

See also
Canadian journalists
Politics of Canada

References 
 
 
 George Perry Graham fonds, Library and Archives Canada

External links
 

1859 births
1943 deaths
Canadian Ministers of Railways and Canals
Canadian senators from Ontario
Liberal Party of Canada MPs
Liberal Party of Canada senators
Ontario Liberal Party MPPs
Leaders of the Ontario Liberal Party
Members of the House of Commons of Canada from Ontario
Members of the King's Privy Council for Canada
Canadian members of the Privy Council of the United Kingdom
Liberal Party of Canada leadership candidates